The Prose and Poetic Eddas, which form the foundation of what we know today concerning Norse mythology, contain many names of dwarfs. While many of them are featured in extant myths of their own, many others have come down to us today only as names in various lists provided for the benefit of skalds or poets of the medieval period and are included here for the purpose of completeness.

List of dwarfs

A

B

D

E

F

G

H

I

J

K

L

M

N

O
{| class="wikitable sortable" style="font-size: 90%; width: 100%"
!Name
!Name meaning
!Alternative names
!Attested relatives
!Attestations
|-
| Óinn || Shy || || Son: Andvari || Reginsmál''', Skáldskaparmál|-
| Olius || || || || Ásmundar saga kappabana|-
| Ǫlni || The one on the fore-arm || || || Skáldskaparmál|-
| Ónn || Hard work, An (undefined) part of a sword || || || Skáldskaparmál|-
| Óri || "The insane", "The violent one" || || || Fjölsvinnsmál, Skáldskaparmál, Völuspá|-
| Ótr || "Otter" || || Father: Hreiðmarr  Brothers: Fafnir, Regin || Gylfaginning, Völsunga saga|}

P

R

S

T

U

V

Y

General references
Faulkes, Anthony (transl. and ed.) (1987). Edda (Snorri Sturluson). Everyman. 
Larrington, Carolyne (transl. and ed.) (1996). The Poetic Edda''. Oxford World's Classics. 
Gurevich, Elena: (Introduction to) Anonymous, Dverga heiti; in Kari Ellen Gade and Edith Marold (eds.): Poetry from Treatises on Poetics - Skaldic Poetry of the Scandinavian Middle Ages 3; Turnhout: Brepols, 2017 (p. 692).
Gould, Chester Nathan: Dwarf-Names - A Study in Old Icelandic Religion; in PMLA, Vol. 44, No. 4 (Dec., 1929) (pp. 939-967).

References

Norse mythology
Dwarves (folklore)
Elves
Norse dwarves